Héctor Fabián Acuña Maciel (born October 27, 1981 in Montevideo, Uruguay) is a Uruguayan footballer currently playing for Rentistas in the Segunda División Uruguaya.

Titles
 Santiago Morning 2005 (Chilean Primera B Championship)
 Deportes Tolima 2014 (Copa Colombia)

External links
 
 
 Profile at Tenfield Digital 

1981 births
Living people
Footballers from Montevideo
Association football forwards
Uruguayan footballers
Rampla Juniors players
C.A. Rentistas players
Santiago Morning footballers
Shelbourne F.C. players
Dorados de Sinaloa footballers
Liverpool F.C. (Montevideo) players
Miramar Misiones players
Racing Club de Montevideo players
C.D. Marathón players
Sportivo Cerrito players
El Tanque Sisley players
Club de Gimnasia y Esgrima La Plata footballers
C.A. Cerro players
Deportes Tolima footballers
Defensor Sporting players
Uruguayan Primera División players
Liga Nacional de Fútbol Profesional de Honduras players
Primera B de Chile players
Categoría Primera A players
Uruguayan expatriate footballers
Expatriate footballers in Chile
Expatriate association footballers in the Republic of Ireland
Expatriate footballers in Argentina
Expatriate footballers in Honduras
Expatriate footballers in Mexico
Expatriate footballers in Colombia